The Highway 2 Bridge is an automobile and pedestrian crossing of the Kansas River on the border of Johnson and Leavenworth Counties in De Soto. The current bridge was built in 1964.

A girder bridge, it is the only bridge over the river for a span of 21 miles, as Linwood's bridge is 10 miles west and Shawnee's K-7 Highway Bridge is 11 miles to the east.

The bridge runs concurrent with Leavenworth County Highway 2 and S. Wyandotte Street.

The two lane bridge has a span of 1,670 feet[1] and was opened in 1965, built at a cost of $600,000. It was designed to be at least three feet higher than the levels reached in the Great Flood of 1951.

Its predecessor bridge was damaged by flood circa. 1895, reopened in 1937, then collapsed after a U.S. Army truck weighed more than the maximum supported wight in 1956, reopened again in 1959 before being damaged beyond use by ice in January 1962. After repairs, the current bridge opened in 1964.

Notes 

Bridges over the Kansas River
Girder bridges in the United States
Road bridges in Kansas
Buildings and structures in Johnson County, Kansas
Buildings and structures in Leavenworth County, Kansas